Hongqing Temple Grotto is located in Yima, Henan. It consists of five caves, with a total of 46 shrines. More than 120 statues were chiseled during the Northern Wei Dynasty. In 1963, it was registered as a place of cultural importance in Henan, and was listed in the fifth edition of Chinese national cultural relics in 2001.

Buddhist temples in Sanmenxia
Chinese Buddhist grottoes
Major National Historical and Cultural Sites in Henan